Sergio Fachelli (born March 28, 1952 in Montevideo, Uruguay) is a singer and songwriter, who had a successful career in the mid-1980s. After a 16-year hiatus, he returned to performing in 2018.

References

Living people
Singers from Montevideo
Uruguayan people of Italian descent
20th-century Uruguayan male singers
1952 births
21st-century Uruguayan male singers